USS N-4 (SS-56) was a N-class coastal defense submarine of the United States Navy.  Her keel was laid down on 24 March 1915 by Lake Torpedo Boat Company in Bridgeport, Connecticut.  The N-boats built by Lake had slightly different specifications from the ones built by Seattle Construction and Drydock and are sometimes considered a separate class.

N-4 was launched on 27 November 1916 sponsored by Miss Dorothy H. Elliott, and commissioned at New York Navy Yard on 15 June 1918.

Service history
Departing New York on 25 June 1918, N-4 proceeded to the New London Submarine Base for outfitting and then she proceeded to the Torpedo Station at Newport, Rhode Island. Returning to New London, Connecticut, on 11 July, she once again departed on 28 July to patrol along the New England coast and guard coastal shipping against German U-boats. Alternating out of New London and New York City, she continued this duty until 3 November. The signing of the Armistice with Germany found this submarine tied up at New London, where, but for a training cruise to Salem, Massachusetts, and Portland, Maine, from 14 July to 30 September 1919, she remained until 1920.

During the first half of 1920, N-4 made short voyages to New York and Newport before she was placed in reserve at New London on 7 June. Taken out of reserve in early September, N-4 sailed for Philadelphia, Pennsylvania, on 15 September for extensive overhaul until 28 March 1921. Returning to New London in early April, she operated off the New England coast, out of Newport and New London until she put into New London on 6 December to have her main engines removed and transferred to a newer L-class submarine. Tug  then towed the hulk of N-4 to Philadelphia. She arrived on 13 April 1922, and was decommissioned on 22 April. The submarine was sold for scrapping on 25 September to Joseph G. Hitner of Philadelphia.

References

External links
 

United States N-class submarines
World War I submarines of the United States
Ships built in Bridgeport, Connecticut
1917 ships